1941 Богдан Хмельницький / Bohdan Khmelnytsky, directed by Ihor Savchenko
 1943 Битва за нашу Радянську Україну / Battle for Soviet Ukraine, directed by Oleksandr Dovzhenko 
 1947 Подвиг розвідника / Secret Agent, directed by Borys Barnet

1940s
Films
Ukrainian